Simona Bonafé (born 24 June 1973 in Varese) is an Italian politician and journalist who currently serves as a member of the Chamber of Deputies.

Career
Simona Bonafé started her political activity in 2002 with The Daisy party.  In 2004 she was appointed Councillor for the Environment in Scandicci, a role she held until 2013.  From 2007, she also worked as a
journalist for the newspapers Corriere di Firenze and Europa.

Bonafé was elected to the Italian parliament in 2013 with the Democratic Party, and in 2014 she was elected Member of the European Parliament (MEP) with the same party collecting over 288,000 preferences.

A member of the Progressive Alliance of Socialists and Democrats group, she has since been serving on the Committee on the Environment, Public Health and Food Safety. In this capacity, she was the parliament's rapporteur on the EU Circular Economy Package and represented the Parliament at the 2016 United Nations Climate Change Conference in Marrakesh.

In addition to her committee assignments, Bonafé was a member of the parliament's delegation for relations with the People's Republic of China. She also serves as vice-chairwoman of the European Parliament Intergroup on Long Term Investment and Reindustrialisation and as member of the European Parliament Intergroup on Anti-Racism and Diversity, the European Parliament Intergroup on Integrity (Transparency, Anti-Corruption and Organized Crime) and the European Parliament Intergroup on Children’s Rights.

Following the resignation of Roberto Gualtieri to return to national politics in late 2019, Bonafé was elected vice-chair of the S&D Group, under the leadership of chairwoman Iratxe García. She was elected back to the Italian parliament in 2022.

References

External links 

European Parliament – Simona Bonafé

1973 births
Living people
Politicians from Varese
Democracy is Freedom – The Daisy politicians
Deputies of Legislature XVII of Italy
Deputies of Legislature XIX of Italy
Democratic Party (Italy) MEPs
MEPs for Italy 2014–2019
MEPs for Italy 2019–2024
21st-century women MEPs for Italy
Italian women journalists
Università Cattolica del Sacro Cuore alumni
Women members of the Chamber of Deputies (Italy)